The  (UN/LOCODE: HTPAP) is the seaport in the capital of Haiti, Port-au-Prince. It suffered catastrophic damage in the 2010 Haiti earthquake.

Some of docks and warehouses are operated by the government's Autorité Portuaire Nationale (APN), and some are run by private companies.

History 
On 13 June 1872, a German fleet composed of SMS Vineta and SMS Gazelle seized Haitian Navy ships Union and Mont Organisé which were anchored in the port, as a means of pressure to have the Haitian government pay a 20,000 thaler debt to a German businessman.

In 1906, a Haitian-American company gained a 50-year concession to manage and operate the port.

In 1973, The Port Administration became an autonomous body with the power to operate other ports; and in 1978, it was renamed the  under Haiti's secretariat of economic affairs. The APN was given control of all of Haiti's other ports as well in 1985.

On October 11, 1993, USS Harlan County, carrying 200 American and Canadian troops in implementation of the Governors Island Accord, attempted to enter the port, but was met by angry crowds, denied access to the dock, and ordered to leave Haiti the next day. On October 13, the United Nations re-imposed an oil and arms embargo.

In 1999, this port was believed to be "the most expensive port at which to dock and unload in the Americas", causing ships to unload in the neighbouring Dominican Republic.

7.0 magnitude 2010 earthquake

On 12 January 2010, a 7.0 magnitude earthquake struck, and crippled the port. The access road to the docks buckled, and slabs of concrete rose six feet above grade. Derrick cranes were thrown into the harbour; the shipping container unloading cranes were left leaning with their bases submerged. The seawall on some slips crumbled, and quayside areas slumped sideways into the harbor, carrying shipping containers into the water. The main pier on the northern end of the port was completely destroyed, with the cranes in the water, and the terminal collapsed. The south pier was severely damaged.

On the 19 January 2010 HNLMS Pelikaan (A804), a Royal Netherlands Navy logistic support vessel was the first ship to enter the crippled harbor. After an extensive hydrographical survey of the harbor, a route was cleared using the ship's crane and HNLMS Pelikaan could finally dock and unload its cargo and marines.  On January 21 it was announced by the Dutch Ministry of Defense that HNLMS Pelikaan had finished unloading its cargo and would depart for Guantanamo Bay Naval Base to pick up the 20 men of Mobile Dive and Salvage Unit 2 (MDSU 2).

U.S. Defense Secretary Robert Gates announced on 20 January 2010 the dispatch of a port clearance ship with cranes to help the port become operational again.

On 21 January 2010, French vessel Francis Garnier moored to the damaged pier, although this is considered unsafe by US military divers.

On 27 January 2010, it was discovered that the south pier was more damaged than initially appeared, and cannot be used safely. It had previously been used by one ship at a time, unloading one container at a time, gingerly. The port is continued to be used by military landing craft of the type used in amphibious warfare to force a beachhead from a seaborne invasion.

As of 24 February 2010, the port had ramped up to handle container traffic around 600 containers a day, despite still having infrastructure damage. This is in excess of the 250 containers a day that it had been handling before the quake. The functioning of the port allows increased aid shipments arriving in-country.

Facilities
Before the 2010 earthquake, the facilities of the port were as follows:
Number of berths: 7
Two Ro-Ro berths: one 14 metres wide; the other 29 metres wide
Total length of berths: 1,250 metres
Depth of water alongside: 8 to 10 metres
One gantry crane of 30 tonnes capacity
One 33 tonne capacity forklift
Six other forklifts with capacities between 3 and 7 tonnes
Sixteen truck trailers
Eight flatbeds for moving containers
Fifteen chassis

Also, there were these private quays in the bay of Port-au-Prince:

The bay has 11 buoys:

See also

 Killick

References

External links
 Washington Post, "Structural damage in Port-au-Prince hampers relief efforts" — Description of damage to the harbor

Port-au-Prince
Port-au-Prince
2010 Haiti earthquake relief